{{DISPLAYTITLE:C25H25NO2}}
The molecular formula C25H25NO2 (molar mass: 371.47 g/mol, exact mass: 371.1885 u) may refer to:

 JWH-081
 JWH-164

Molecular formulas